Nick Love (born 24 December 1969) is an English film director and writer. His credits include the films The Football Factory, The Business, Goodbye Charlie Bright, Outlaw, The Sweeney, and a 2009 remake of football hooliganism drama The Firm.

His parents divorced when he was five years of age, and he was brought up on a large council estate in South London.

Career
Love attended the Bournemouth Film School at the age of 24.

In 2001, Nick Love made "Goodbye Charlie Bright", focusing on working class life on council estates.

Love wrote and directed The Football Factory in 2004. The film was based on a book by John King.

In 2005, Love directed the film The Business, which reflects the 1980s Costa Del Crime era. It was all taken from what he had read and heard from others about that particular time.
In 2007, Love produced the vigilante movie Outlaw.

In 2009, Love directed The Firm. The film focused on male friendship, football hooliganism and the football casual movement.

On 1 August 2012, Love's film The Sweeney made its world premiere at the opening of the Locarno International Film Festival in Switzerland. The film is based on the British television police drama of the same name. Love said that he had interest in making the movie for several years, but had difficult negotiations with studio executives who wanted him to make the film with an Americanised style.

Speaking at the UK premiere of The Sweeney in London, Alan Ford, who played Harry, explained that Nick Love "works very fast" and "does not mess about" as a director.

In 2015, Love directed "American Hero", an American-British superhero comedy.

In August 2021, it was announced that Love would direct a new crime based series, which he has written, called A Town Called Malice. Love has said that "I'm over excited and hugely grateful to Sky for supporting my vision once again – I have lived and breathed Malice for the past few years, and for it finally to come to fruition, is a dream come true".

Love was a follower of the "casual" culture present in the 1980s, something which is present in many of his films.

Personal
Love was married to EastEnders actress Patsy Palmer from 1998 to 2000.

Love is an avid Millwall F.C. fan, having followed the team from a young age. His hobbies include walking and clay pigeon shooting. He lives in Gloucestershire.

On 4 September 2021, Love wrote in The Times Luxx Magazine that he had been struggling with long Covid-19 symptoms and had attended a clinic in Spain which had successfully treated his condition.

Filmography

Film

Producer only

Executive producer only

Television

References

External links

1969 births
English film directors
Living people
Alumni of Arts University Bournemouth